"Hunting for Witches" is a song by English rock band Bloc Party. It was released as the third single from their second studio album, A Weekend in the City, on 9 July 2007. The song peaked at number 22 on the UK Singles Chart.

Composition
"Hunting for Witches" lyrics were influenced by the terrorist attacks on London's transportation system in July 2005, the September 11, 2001 attacks in the United States, and the media's reaction to the attacks. It also touches upon the amount of control the media has over modern society. Frontman Kele Okereke stated in an interview:
The 30 bus in Hackney, which is just around the corner from where I live, was blown up. [That song was] written when I was just observing the reactions of the mainstream press in [the UK] and I was just amazed at how easy it'd been to whip them up into a fury. ... I guess the point about the song for me is post-September 11th, the media has really traded on fear and the use of fear in controlling people.

Music video
The music video for the song was the most minimalist one from the album. It simply features the band performing the song in a dark room, using some unique overhead shots in some parts of the video. The video is credited as being directed by Alan Smithee.

Track listing

7" vinyls
 Wichita / WEBB130S (UK) (In gatefold sleeve which houses second 7")

 Wichita / WEBB130SX (UK)

CDs
 Wichita / WEBB130SCD (UK)

 Wichita / WEBB130SRMX (UK)

 Manufactured CD, but labelled "for promotional use only".

Download

Charts

References

2007 singles
Bloc Party songs
Music about the September 11 attacks
Song recordings produced by Jacknife Lee
Music videos credited to Alan Smithee
2007 songs
Wichita Recordings singles
Songs written by Kele Okereke
Songs written by Gordon Moakes
Songs written by Russell Lissack
Songs written by Matt Tong